Peter John Doak, OAM (born 9 March 1944) was an Australian sprint freestyle swimmer of the 1960s, who won a bronze medal in the 4×100-metre freestyle relay at the 1964 Summer Olympics in Tokyo. He attended Geelong College between 1955 and 1960 where he joined the swimming team in 1958.

Doak combined with Bob Windle, David Dickson and John Ryan to win bronze in the 4 × 100 m freestyle relay, behind the United States and German teams, the first time this event had been contested at the Olympics. Doak had previously won gold in the 4×110-yard freestyle relay at the 1962 Commonwealth Games in Perth, and finished fourth in the corresponding individual event. In 2014, Doak was awarded the medal of the Order of Australia.

See also
 List of Commonwealth Games medallists in swimming (men)
 List of Olympic medalists in swimming (men)

References

 

1944 births
Living people
Australian male freestyle swimmers
Olympic swimmers of Australia
Sportsmen from Victoria (Australia)
Swimmers at the 1964 Summer Olympics
Olympic bronze medalists in swimming
Recipients of the Medal of the Order of Australia
Medalists at the 1964 Summer Olympics
Olympic bronze medalists for Australia
Swimmers at the 1962 British Empire and Commonwealth Games
Commonwealth Games medallists in swimming
Commonwealth Games gold medallists for Australia
20th-century Australian people
Medallists at the 1962 British Empire and Commonwealth Games